Kalateh-ye Rey (also Romanized as Kalāteh-ye Rey) is a village in Kharturan Rural District, Beyarjomand District, Shahrud County, Semnan Province, Iran. At the 2006 census, its population was 90, in 23 families.

References 

Populated places in Shahrud County